Nymphicula junctalis is a moth in the family Crambidae. It was described by George Hampson in 1891. It is found in India in the Nilgiri Mountains and Kanara district. Records from Japan refer to Nymphicula yoshiyasui.

The wingspan is 14–15 mm. The base and basal two-thirds of the costa of the forewings are fuscous. There is a yellow subbasal fascia from the dorsum to the costa, which is edged with brown. The medial area of the wing is scattered with dark brown scales and the terminal area is yellow. The hindwings have a yellow subbasal fascia, edged with brown, as well as a silver-grey spot on the inner margin.

References

Nymphicula
Moths described in 1891